Film production is an industry in the Greater Toronto Area, with the City of Toronto being colloquially referred to as Hollywood North. The city is home to a number of film production companies, as well as Canada's largest film studio, Pinewood Toronto Studios.

A number of films shot in the city use Toronto as a setting in film. However, the majority of non-Canadian films that were shot in Toronto, do not explicitly use the city as the setting for the film being shot. Many American produced films use the city as a stand in for a city in Midwestern United States, or New York City.

Movies

Music videos

See also
Cinema of Canada

Notes

References

External links
List of productions currently filming in Toronto at the Toronto Film & Television Office
Titles with locations including Toronto, Ontario, Canada at the Internet Movie Database

List
Toronto
Films shot in Toronto